Gainsborough railway station may refer to the following stations in Gainsborough, Lincolnshire:

 Gainsborough Central railway station
 Gainsborough Lea Road railway station